Steniodes declivalis is a moth in the family Crambidae. It was described by Harrison Gray Dyar Jr. in 1914. It is found in Panama, Costa Rica and Venezuela.

The wingspan is about 13 mm. Adults are similar to Steniodes gelliasalis, but are smaller, darker and the whitish outer line of the hindwings is distinct, sharply angled and touches the outer margin.

References

Moths described in 1914
Spilomelinae